Haw Creek is a  long 3rd order tributary to the Haw River, in Alamance County, North Carolina.

Variant names
According to the Geographic Names Information System, it has also been known historically as:  
Jumping Run

Course
Haw Creek rises in a pond about 0.5 miles southeast of Mebane in Orange County, North Carolina and then flows southwest into Alamance County to the Haw River about 3 miles south of Swepsonville, North Carolina.

Watershed
Haw Creek drains  of area, receives about 46.3 in/year of precipitation, and has a wetness index of 427.99 and is about 49% forested.

See also
List of rivers of North Carolina

References

Rivers of North Carolina
Rivers of Alamance County, North Carolina